Hans-Jürgen Orthmann (born 5 February 1954) is a German former long-distance runner who competed for West Germany. He made thirteen consecutive appearances at the IAAF World Cross Country Championships from 1975 to 1987. His highest honour was a silver medal in 1980. He was a seven-time national champion, taking three titles in cross country running, two in road running and two in track.

His silver medal at the 1980 IAAF World Cross Country Championships made him only the second German to win an individual medal at the competition, after 1977 bronze medallist Detlef Uhlemann. Orthmann's finish remains the best ever by a German athlete. Orthmann was consistently among the best performing West German men at the competition in the 1970s and 1980s, scoring points for team alongside others including Michael Karst, Christoph Herle, Michael Scheytt and Ralf Salzmann. Their best finishes in the team competition were fourth place, achieved in 1977 and 1979.

He won his first international medal as a teenager, taking the 3000 metres gold at the 1973 European Athletics Junior Championships. He represented West Germany as a senior in that event four times at the European Athletics Indoor Championships, including a bronze medal at the 1980 edition.

Among his performances on the professional circuit were a win at the Hyogo Relays in 1982 and a runner-up finish at the 1977 Paderborner Osterlauf.

Personal bests
3000 metres – 7:48.09 min (1976)
5000 metres – 13:30.53 min (1982)
10,000 metres – 28:02.92 min (1985)
All info from All-Athletics

International competitions

National titles
West German Athletics Championships
5000 metres: 1974
10,000 metres: 1982
West German Road Championships
25 kilometres: 1979, 1980
West German Cross Country Championships
Long course: 1983, 1984
Short course: 1980

See also
List of 5000 metres national champions (men)

References

External links

Living people
1954 births
German male long-distance runners
West German male long-distance runners